The men's wakeboard freestyle competition in water skiing at the 2001 World Games took place from 23 to 25 August 2001 at the Ogata Water Ski Course in Ogata, Akita, Japan.

Competition format
A total of 16 athletes entered the competition. Best three athletes from preliminary heats qualify directly to the final. In last chance qualifiers two athletes also qualifies for the final.

Results

Preliminary

Heat 1

Heat 2

Last Chance Qualifiers

Final

References

External links
 Results on IWGA website

Water skiing at the 2001 World Games